Lucas Eberle (born 13 October 1990 in Vaduz) is a Liechtensteiner footballer who plays for FC Schaan.

Career
Eberle began his career in the youth side with the U-14 of FC Vaduz and signed in summer 2008 for FC Balzers. In the summer of 2010, Eberle moved onto USV Eschen/Mauren, and returned to Balzers in 2011.

International career
He was a member of the Liechtenstein national football team and holds 12 caps.

References

1990 births
Living people
Liechtenstein footballers
Liechtenstein international footballers
FC Vaduz players
Liechtenstein under-21 international footballers
FC Balzers players
Association football midfielders
People from Vaduz